Frans De Blaes (17 September 1909 – 27 February 2010) was a Belgian sprint canoeist who competed in the late 1930s. He competed in the K-2 1000 m at the 1936 Summer Olympics in Berlin, but eliminated in the heats. At the time of his death he was Belgium's oldest living Olympic competitor.

References

June 2008 interview with De Blaes
Frans De Blaes' obituary 

1909 births
2010 deaths
Belgian male canoeists
Canoeists at the 1936 Summer Olympics
Olympic canoeists of Belgium
Belgian centenarians
Flemish sportspeople
Men centenarians